Sharoon Siraj (born 14 September 1997) is a Pakistani cricketer who plays for Southern Punjab. Siraj made his T20 debut for Southern Punjab against Khyber Pakhtunkhwa during the 2021–22 National T20 Cup on 10 October 2021. He made his List A for Southern Punjab against Sindh during the 2021–22 Pakistan Cup on 2 March 2022. Siraj made his first-class debut for Southern Punjab against Sindh during the 2022-23 Quaid-e-Azam Trophy on 9 October 2022.

References

External links 
 
 Sharoon Siraj at Pakistan Cricket Board

1997 births
Living people
Pakistani cricketers
Southern Punjab (Pakistan) cricketers
People from Bahawalpur